Afraflacilla mushrif is a species of jumping spider that lives in the United Arab Emirates. The female was first identified in 2010 and placed in the genus Pseudicius. The species was transferred to Afraflacilla in 2017.

References

Salticidae
Spiders described in 2010
Spiders of the Arabian Peninsula
Taxa named by Wanda Wesołowska